Çavuşlu is a village in the Devrekani District of Kastamonu Province in Turkey. Its population is 77 (2021).

References

Villages in Devrekani District